Dipljapyx is a genus of diplurans in the family Japygidae.

Species
 Dipljapyx beroni Pagés, 1974
 Dipljapyx fagniezi Pagés, 1952
 Dipljapyx hirpinus SIlvestri, 1948
 Dipljapyx humbertii (Grassi, 1886)
 Dipljapyx italicus (Silvestri, 1908)
 Dipljapyx limbarae Silvestri, 1948
 Dipljapyx nexus Silvestri, 1948
 Dipljapyx sardous Silvestri, 1948
 Dipljapyx silanus Silvestri, 1948

References

Diplura